Tennille may refer to:
 Tennille, Georgia, United States
Tennille (dog), guide dog supporting blind hiker Trevor Thomas

People with the name
 Francis Tennille (1747–1819), American Revolutionary War Lieutenant Colonel
 Toni Tennille (born 1940), American singer, part of the duo Captain & Tennille

See also 
 Captain & Tennille, American recording artists primarily active in the 1970s
 Tenille, an alternate spelling of the given name